Albert Bazeyan (born 28 May 1956) is an Armenian politician. He served as Mayor of Yerevan from August 1999 to January 2001.

Biography 
Albert Bazeyan was born in Lanjaghbyur, Armenia SSR. He attended the Yerevan Institute of Physical Culture from 1971 to 1976, where he earned a PhD . From 1976 to 1977, he served in the Soviet Army, then returned to the Armenian Institute of Physical Culture, where he worked at as a coach and a teacher. Bazeyan was sent to Moscow as a trainee researcher and received his postgraduate diploma at the Central State Institute of Physical Culture in Moscow, which he attended from 1984 to 1987. He then became a researcher at the Armenian Institute of Physical Culture in 1988.

In 1993, Bazeyan left the Armenian Institute of Physical Culture and became the Deputy Chairman of the Yerkrapah Volunteer Union. He also began working at the Armenian Defense Ministry that same year. Bazeyan became a member of the National Assembly of Armenia, Vice-Speaker of the National Assembly, and Chairman of the Yerkrapah in 1996. He was also awarded the Order of the Combat Cross (2nd degree) for his services during the First Nagorno-Karabakh War.

Bazeyan was reelected Vice-Speaker on 30 May 1999 and joined the Unity bloc led by Vazgen Sargsyan and Karen Demirchyan. He was elected Mayor of Yerevan in August 1999 and served until January 2001. In 2003, he became a member of parliament again as a member of the Standing Committee on Defense, National Security and Internal Affairs. Bazeyan joined opposition Hanrapetutyun Party and left the parliament in 2007.

Awards 
 Order of the Combat Cross, 2nd degree (1996)

References

Sources

External links 
Armenian National Assembly Profile

1956 births
Living people
Armenian State Institute of Physical Culture and Sport alumni
Armenian military personnel of the Nagorno-Karabakh War
Mayors of Yerevan
Hanrapetutyun Party politicians